Katrin Nyman-Metcalf (born 7 May 1963) is an Estonian-Swedish legal scholar. From 1990 to 1992 she was the State Secretary of Estonia of the Estonian government-in-exile.
She was born in Stockholm to Estonian-Swedish engineer Einar Nyman and Estonian textbook author and drawing teacher . In 1987, she graduated from Uppsala University's Faculty of Law. She defended her doctoral thesis in 1999 also in Uppsala. She was the State Secretary of the Estonian government-in-exile from 1990 to 1992.

Since 2010, she teaches at Tallinn University of Technology.

References

Living people
1963 births
Estonian legal scholars
Swedish legal scholars
Uppsala University alumni
Academic staff of the Tallinn University of Technology
People from Stockholm